Hector Township may refer to the following townships in the United States:

 Hector Township, Potter County, Pennsylvania
 Hector Township, Renville County, Minnesota

See also 
 Hectors Creek Township, Harnett County, North Carolina